The Transcontinental Railroad Grade is a section of railway in northwest Utah, near Corinne, Utah, which was listed on the National Register of Historic Places in 1994.

It is an abandoned  section of the original 1869 grade of the first transcontinental railroad. Its raised grade (trackway), 11 trestles, and 21 culverts were built in 1869 or in years soon after. This section was built poorly by the Union Pacific, consistent with financial incentives, and was acquired by the Central Pacific in 1869, which found it necessary to replace trestles and otherwise rebuild the route here.

The trestles were built largely with redwood, and have vertical round beams supporting stringers supporting railway ties. Just three of them were in good condition in 1992.

The section runs roughly from  miles west of Corinne for about  further west along what is now Utah State Route 83. It is near Promontory Summit where the ceremonial golden spike was hammered in to complete the six-year project by three companies to build the transcontinental railway.

See also
List of bridges documented by the Historic American Engineering Record in Utah
National Register of Historic Places listings in Box Elder County, Utah

References

External links
Historic American Engineering Record (HAER) documentation, filed under Corinne, Box Elder County, UT:

Note: HAER No. UT-64-H is within the boundaries of Golden Spike National Historical Park

Trestle bridges in the United States
Rail infrastructure in Utah
Historic American Engineering Record in Utah
National Register of Historic Places in Box Elder County, Utah
Buildings and structures completed in 1869
Bridges in Utah
Railroad bridges on the National Register of Historic Places in Utah